There are a large variety of campus types and programs in the SUNY system; each site overlaps somewhat in specialties. SUNY divides its campuses into four categories: university centers / doctoral-granting institutions, comprehensive colleges, technology colleges, and community colleges. SUNY also has a unique relationship with its statutory colleges, which embed state-owned, state-funded colleges within other institutions such as Cornell University and Alfred University. Students at the statutory colleges pay tuition at a state-subsidized rate and are considered students of the private institutions in which the state-funded colleges are embedded.

SUNY and the City University of New York are different university systems, even though both are public institutions that receive funding from New York State. SUNY should not be confused with the University of the State of New York (USNY), which is the governmental umbrella organization for most education-related institutions and many education-related personnel (both public and private) in New York State, and which includes, as a component, the New York State Education Department.

The State University of New York at Potsdam, founded in 1816, is the oldest institution in the system. Empire State College, founded in 1971, is the most recent addition to the SUNY system.  In terms of enrollment, the largest institution is the University at Buffalo, with over 31,508 students and the smallest member is the College of Optometry, with 408 students. In terms of area, Stony Brook University is the largest public university in the state of New York.

All of the SUNY schools are accredited by the Middle States Association of Colleges and Schools, in addition to other program-specific accreditations held by individual campuses such as the Association to Advance Collegiate Schools of Business and the Association of Collegiate Business Schools and Programs.  The system's central administration is in Albany, New York, in the Old Delaware and Hudson Railroad Company Building.

University centers / doctoral degree granting institutions

Comprehensive Colleges

Technology colleges

Community colleges

Map

Notes
  Each college's founding year is linked to the category of all schools founded in that year.

See also

Open SUNY
State University of New York Press

References

External links

 
New York State Education Department
State University of New York
State University of New York